Bergen Cathedral School (Norwegian: Bergen Katedralskole, Latin: Schola Cathedralis Bergensis, formerly known as Bergens lærdeskole and Bergen latinskole and colloquially known as Katten) is an upper secondary school in Bergen, Norway. Located in the city centre, next to Bergen Cathedral, the school has about 850 students, 95 full-time teachers, and 5 administration personnel, including the headmaster, Lise Hårklau Holsen.

The school is considered to have been founded in 1153 by Nicholas Breakspear (later Pope Adrian IV), making the school the second oldest in Norway together with Oslo Cathedral School and Hamar Cathedral School, which were founded the same year, one year after the founding of Trondheim Cathedral School.

History
Although the earliest written records documenting the school's existence date back to 1288, Bergen Cathedral School is believed to have been founded in 1153 by Nicholas Breakspear, who became Pope Adrian IV in 1154. It was founded as a theological school for the education of priests. Pupils would start attending the school around the age of seven. Until the school reform in 1806, the school was tied to the church.

The school moved to its present location in 1840. The original building is still in use as the offices for the administration, as well as some classrooms. This building also houses the school library. In 1869 the school's gyms were built, and the same year the school changed its name from "Bergen Latinskole" to its present "Bergen katedralskole".

The school was independent until 1896, but has been administered by the government since. In 1972, the school was made a regular upper secondary school administered by the county government.

Buildings
A classrooms only building was built in 1957. Another building, containing science laboratories, computer rooms and a cafeteria was built in 1992.

In July 2007, large amounts of mold were discovered in the building from 1840. This led to the building getting closed, resulting in a shortage of teacher offices. The building contains several old classrooms, an auditorium and the school library, which is the oldest library known in Norway. For a while, the school administration considered delaying the start of the term, but this never happened as the teachers and the day-time adult education classes ended up moving into temporary barracks in the schoolyards of Bergen Cathedral School and Tanks Upper Secondary School. In February 2008, it was decided that the building will be renovated at a price of 6 million NOK as a temporary solution that will last until at least 2014.

From 2016 to 2017, the original building was closed for renovation and an additional building was being added between it and the classroom wing. The administration, the school library and some classes weretemporarily located at the former Tanks videregående skole.

Academics

Of the mainline courses offered in Norwegian upper secondary schools, only the generalist line, studiespesialisering, is offered by Bergen Cathedral School. The school is the only one in Bergen offering the IB Diploma Programme, from which about forty students graduate per year. In the 2005–2006 school year, the senior year students of Bergen Cathedral School received the third best grades in Western Norway, which was the highest achieving region of Norway. The school has a reputation as a prestigious school, because of its history and high grade requirements.

Notable people

Alumni

A number of the most famous alumni in the history of the school are engraved in a plaque in the old building from 1840:
 Gjeble Pederssøn (c. 1490–1557), bishop
 Absalon Pederssøn Beyer (1578-1575), clergyman, writer and lecturer
 Edvard Edvardsen (1630-1695), historian
 Petter Dass (1647-1707), poet
 Ludvig Holberg (1684-1754), writer, playwright and lawyer
 Hans Strøm (1726-1797), topographer
 Claus Fasting (1674-1739), merchant, mayor and historian
 Martin Vahl (1749-1804), botanist and zoologist
 Nils Hertzberg (1827-1911), politician, theologist and teacher
 Jens Zetlitz (1761-1821), poet
 Hans Jacob Grøgaard (1764-1836), priest and Eidsvoll delegate
 Christopher Frimann Omsen (1761-1829), civil servant and Eidsvoll delegate
 Lyder Sagen (1777-1850), teacher and poet
 Wilhelm Frimann Koren Christie (1778-1849), civil servant and Eidsvoll delegate
 Nicolai Wergeland (1780-1848), theologist and Eidsvoll delegate
 Edvard Hagerup (1781-1853), politician
 Christian Lassen (1800-1876), orientalist
 Georg Prahl Harbitz (1802-1889), priest and politician
 Michael Sars (1805-1869), theologian and biologist
 Frederik Stang (1808-1884), Prime Minister
 Johann Sebastian Welhaven (1807-1873), poet and critic
 Ludvig Kristensen Daa (1809-1877), politician, historian and journalist
 Ole Bull (1810-1880) violinist and composer
 Johan Fritzner (1812-1893), priest and lexicographer
 Peter Andreas Jensen (1812-1867), priest and writer
 Sven Brun (1812-1894), priest
 Ole Irgens (1829-1906), teacher and politician
 Peter Waage (1833-1900), chemist
 Jacob Worm-Müller (1834-1889), physiologist
 Henrik Mohn (1835-1916), meteorologist
 Ernst Sars (1835-1917), historian and politician
 Armauer Hansen (1841-1912), physician

 Alf Torp (1853-1916), philologist
 Gerhard Gran (1856-1925), writer
 Christian Michelsen (1857-1925), shipping magnate and Prime Minister
 Lauritz Stub Wiberg (1875-1929), actor
 Harald Sæverud (1897-1992), composer
 Helge Ingstad (1899-2001), polar explorer, lawyer, Governor of Norwegian Occupied East Greenland 1932-33
 Nordahl Grieg (1902-1943), poet, novelist, dramatist, and journalist
 Johan Nielsen (1885-1963), Norwegian sailor priest with an outstanding history and footprint from South American to the Far East.
 Per Hysing-Dahl (1920-1989), politician

Other notable alumni
 Johan Koren Christie (1814–1885), writer
 Hartvig Lassen (1824-1897), editor and historian
 Jonas Lie (1833-1908), writer
 Wollert Konow (1845-1924), Prime Minister
Hans Gerhard Stub (1849-1931), Church Bishop
Elizabeth Stephansen (1872-1961) mathematician and the first Norwegian woman earning a PhD in Mathematics.
Elise Stoltz (1872 – 1931) doctor and the first female leader of the student society Hugin at Bergen Cathedral School.
 Arnulf Øverland (1889-1968), writer
 Sverre Steen (1898-1983), historian.
 Knut Fægri (1909-2001) botanist and palaeoecologist
 Kaare Meland (1915-2002), politician
Gunnvor Rundhovde (1918-1987), Professor of Nordic languages at the University of Bergen 
Ingrid Espelid Hovig (1924–2018) TV-chef and author
 Georg Johannesen (1931-2005), writer and academic
 Narve Bjørgo (1936-), academic
 Ole D. Mjøs (1939-), academic
 Jarle Aarbakke (1942-), academic
 Gunnar Staalesen (1947-), writer
 Ingelin Killengreen (1947-), lawyer and Norway's first police commissioner
 Siri Hustvedt (1955-), writer
 Gabriel Fliflet (1958-), musician
 Harald Tveit Alvestrand (1959-), computer scientist
 Karoline Krüger (1970-), singer & pianist
 Heikki Holmås (1972-), politician
Tore Eikeland (1990-2011) politician and youth party leader of AUF in Hordaland, killed at Utøya
 Merethe Lindstrøm (1963-), author, winner of Nordic Council's Literature Prize 2012

Staff
 Hans Holmboe (1798-1868)
 Johan Koren Christie (1814–1885)
 Emanuel Mohn (1842-1891)
 Gerhard Gran (1856-1925)
Ahlert Hysing (1793–1879)

See also

 List of the oldest schools in the world

References

Other sources

External links
 School website 
 History 
 Digitalarkivet - Bergen Katedralskole 

Secondary schools in Norway
Cathedral schools
International Baccalaureate schools in Norway
Schools in Bergen
Educational institutions established in the 12th century
1153 establishments in Europe
12th-century establishments in Norway
Hordaland County Municipality